Prionus Geoffroy, 1762 is a genus of long-horned beetles of the subfamily Prioninae, tribe Prionini, widespread in Europe, Asia and North America.

Description

The members of this genus are large (25–70 mm) and usually brown or black.

All members of the genus Prionus have twelve or more strongly toothed or even flabellate antennomeres on their large antennae.
 
The only species present in England is "The Tanner", Prionus coriarius (Linnaeus, 1758).

Common North American species include the "Tile-horned Prionus", Prionus imbricornis, the "California root borer", Prionus californicus, and the "Broad-necked root borer", Prionus laticollis.

Biology
The adults are nocturnal and are attracted to light, while their larvae feed on rotting wood or roots.

Species
The following species are recognised in the genus Prionus:

 Prionus arenarius Hovore, 1981 
 Prionus aztecus Casey, 1912
 Prionus californicus Motschulsky, 1845
 Prionus coriarius (Linnaeus, 1758) 
 Prionus corpulentus  Bates, 1878 
 Prionus debilis Casey, 1891
 Prionus delavayi Fairmaire, 1887
 Prionus elegans Demelt, 1972 
 Prionus elliotti Gahan, 1906 
 Prionus emarginatus Say, 1824 
 Prionus evae Demelt, 1972 
 Prionus evoluticornis Komiya & Nogueira, 2014 
 Prionus fissicornis Haldeman, 1845
 Prionus flohri Bates, 1884
 Prionus gahani Lameere, 1912 
 Prionus galantiorum Drumont & Komiya, 2006 
 Prionus geminus Santos-Silva, Nearns & Swift, 2016 
 Prionus heroicus Semenov, 1907
 Prionus howdeni Chemsak, 1979
 Prionus imbricornis (Linnaeus, 1767)
 Prionus insularis Motschulsky, 1858 
 Prionus integer LeConte, 1851 
 Prionus komiyai Lorenc, 1999 
 Prionus kucerai Drumont & Komiya, 2006 
 Prionus lameerei Semenov, 1927 
 Prionus laminicornis Fairmaire, 1897 
 Prionus laticollis (Drury, 1773)
 Prionus lecontei Lameere, 1912
 Prionus mali Drumont, Xi & Rapuzzi, 2015 
 Prionus mexicanus Bates, 1884
 Prionus murzini Drumont & Komiya 2006 
 Prionus nakamurai Ohbayashi & Makihara, 1985 
 Prionus ohbayashii Komiya, 2009 
 Prionus palparis Say, 1824 
 Prionus pocularis Dalman in Schoenherr, 1817
 Prionus poultoni Lameere, 1912
 Prionus puae Drumont & Komiya, 2006
 Prionus scabripunctatus Hayashi, 1971 
 Prionus sejunctus Hayashi, 1959 
 Prionus sifanicus Plavilstshikov, 1934 
 Prionus simplex (Casey, 1912) 
 Prionus siskai Drumont & Komiya, 2006 
 Prionus sontinh Do, Drumont & Komiya, 2019 
 Prionus spinipennis Hovore & Turnbow, 1984 
 Prionus sterbai Heyrovsky, 1950 
 Prionus vartianorum Fuchs, 1967

References

External links
 
 check-list of world-wide Prionus-species
 gallery of Prionus-species
 Bugguide.net page on Prionus
 Prionus californicus
 Prionus borers

Prioninae
Cerambycidae genera